The Japan Pharmaceutical Manufacturers Association (JPMA) is the organization representing the research-based pharmaceutical industry operating in Japan.

The JPMA has 74 members including 20 overseas affiliates (as of October 1, 2006).

See also 
 Juvenile Products Manufacturers Association (JPMA)
 European Federation of Pharmaceutical Industries and Associations (EFPIA)
 International Federation of Pharmaceutical Manufacturers Associations (IFPMA)
 Pharmaceutical Research and Manufacturers of America (PhRMA)
 Portuguese Pharmaceutical Industry Association

External links 
 Japan Pharmaceutical Manufacturers Association (JPMA)

Pharmaceutical industry trade groups
Pharmaceutical companies of Japan